Danni Xtravaganza (July 14, 1961 - January 9, 1996) (sometimes spelled Danny and/or Extravaganza) was a founding member of the House of Xtravaganza (est. 1982), the first primarily Latino house in the underground Harlem ball culture.

Biography 
Born July 14, 1961 in Puerto Rico, Daniel Camacho was raised in Brooklyn, New York by his mother until he left home at 16. Consistent with the tradition of ball culture, in 1982 Danni took the House name as his surname. As a teenager he studied ballroom dancing, the foundation of the elegant Vogue dance style he performed on the ballroom runways. In ball culture where House members compete in various categories, Danni Xtravaganza was widely respected for his unique ability to compete in categories as diverse as Vogue (dance), Runway (modeling), Punk Rock (fashion), and Butch Queen in Drags (a man impersonating a woman).

In 1990 Danni appeared in the popular Jenny Livingston documentary Paris Is Burning and recorded 'Love the Life You Live', produced by Freddy Bastone for Nu Groove records.

A 'legendary' figure in the New York ball community, and a fixture in the famed discos and nightclubs of the period including Paradise Garage, Tracks and The Sound Factory, Danni was appointed the Mother of the House of Xtravaganza by the original House Mother, Angie Xtravaganza, prior to her death in 1993. Danni led the House of Xtravaganza in that capacity until his death on January 9, 1996, in Manhattan, aged 34. He was cremated.

References 

 Danni Xtravaganza (July 14, 1961 - Jan. 9, 1996); Paris is Burning, documentary 1990 Jenny Livingston
 'Flesh and Blood', Michael Cunningham, 1996, Simon + Schuster, Acknowledgement
 'Strictly Ballroom: After Decades in the Shadow of Vogue Dancing and Culture, Ballroom Beats Come to the Fore', Marke B, xlr8r.com
 BlackBook Magazine; "My Experience at the 21st Annual Latex Ball", Steve Lewis, August 22, 2011
 Details; October, 1988, "Nations", ChiChi Valenti, photography by Timothy Greenfield-Sanders. pgs. 159-174
 Time; May 22, 1989, "They're Puttin' On the Vogue". pg. 103
 Michael Cunningham, 1995, Open City magazine, issue #6, "The Slap of Love"
 The New York Observer; "Pater Is Burning! Rad Dads in Drag", Simon Doonan, June 16, 2003
 Vogue; "Economy Class", vol.178, Issue 12, December, 1988. pgs. 368-371
 Vanity Fair; "Fanfair: Striking Poses", Christa D'Souza, pg. 54
 "Voguing & the House Ballroom Scene of New York City 1989-92", pgs. 186-87, Chantal Regnault photographer, Soul Jazz Books, 2011
 "Voguing Music"' Tim Lawrence, "Voguing & the Ballroom Scene of New York City 1976 - 96", CD set insert, pg. 13' Soul Jazz Records, 2012

External links 
 

1961 births
1996 deaths
AIDS-related deaths in New York (state)
Puerto Rican LGBT entertainers
House of Xtravaganza
20th-century LGBT people